Miho Kamogawa (born 27 August 1997) is a Japanese professional footballer who plays as a midfielder for WE League club JEF United Chiba Ladies.

Club career 
Kamogawa made her WE League debut on 20 September 2021.

References 

WE League players
Living people
1997 births
Japanese women's footballers
Women's association football midfielders
Association football people from Ibaraki Prefecture
JEF United Chiba Ladies players